The General Electric GE36 was an experimental aircraft engine, a hybrid between a turbofan and a turboprop, known as an unducted fan (UDF) or propfan. The GE36 was developed by General Electric Aircraft Engines, with its CFM International equal partner Snecma taking a 35 percent share of development. Development was cancelled in 1989.

Development
General Electric (GE) started performing studies and component test work on the concept that would become the UDF in 1981, based on the initial results of early National Aeronautics and Space Administration (NASA) propfan technology studies that the aerospace agency first released to engine makers in 1980. GE then followed up with full-scale development testing of the GE36 starting in 1982. NASA gave GE a $20.4 million contract in February 1984 to study the concept after the company showed the agency its work in December 1983, as NASA's own propfan research efforts were advancing at a slower pace and were dependent on additional grants from the U.S. Congress.

Around the same time, GE was negotiating with Boeing, which felt that the UDF technology could be useful for short-haul airliners, to test a demonstration engine on a Boeing 727 testbed aircraft. Agreement to flight test the UDF was reached in April, with flights beginning in late 1986 to assess a  demonstrator based on a General Electric F404 core. The engine would have a pair of six-stage contra-rotating free turbines, each with large diameters running at slow speeds, and they would be connected directly to a couple of eight-blade,  unducted fans. The effective bypass ratio (BPR) was estimated to be about 30:1 for the UDF, which was much larger than the 6:1 bypass ratios of modern turbofans at the time, but less than propeller/turboprop BPRs of approximately 50:1. The optimal mission would be on  flights with a cruise speed of Mach 0.75. In May 1984, Boeing began testing a GE contra-rotating model test rig in its  low-speed wind tunnel and  transonic wind tunnel.

GE unveiled a full-scale model of the engine at the Farnborough Air Show in September, promising a 30-percent reduction in fuel consumption compared to current airliner engines without decreasing the cruise speed. A dozen airlines "invited themselves" to see GE's UDF test facilities near Cincinnati, Ohio, claimed the engine maker, but not just due to the UDF's higher fuel efficiency. Airlines also appreciated the UDF's lack of a gearbox, which transfers power from the turbine to the propeller while allowing both to run at their respective optimal rotational speeds, but was difficult to design reliably for high speed and power. They also liked that the UDF had contra-rotating fans, as opposed to the single-rotating fans that NASA was primarily studying. The double fans kept the diameter for a 140-seat airliner significantly smaller than the  diameters the airlines feared. The UDF demonstrator, which would have enough power to drive a 200-seat airliner, was intentionally sized to be larger than the UDF engines that GE was planning for production. The UDF production engines would be  in diameter, produce , and power airplanes in the 120-160 seat market. At the Paris Air Show in mid-1985, Snecma announced that it had obtained a 35-percent stake in the engine program. Later in the decade, the GE36 became the power plant of choice for proposed aircraft such as the Boeing 7J7 twin-aisle airliner and the MD-91 and MD-92 derivatives of McDonnell Douglas's popular MD-80 single-aisle airplane.

The engine underwent 2,500 hours of model scale testing, after which a prototype was built. The prototype engine was ground-tested for 162 hours. In April 1987, Boeing formally selected the GE36 as the powerplant for the Boeing 7J7, deeming the IAE SuperFan ultra-high bypass (UHB) geared turbofan as less fuel efficient and the Pratt & Whitney/Allison 578-DX geared propfan as insufficiently powered. At the Paris Air Show in June 1987, GE and Snecma noted that they were building the components for a product design engine that would test on a Boeing 727 in 1989. However, Boeing in August 1987 postponed the service entry date of the 7J7 from 1992 to 1993, and then it postponed the target date indefinitely in December 1987.

GE's proof-of-concept engine was installed on a McDonnell Douglas MD-80 on April 5, 1987, and its first flight on the MD-80 testbed was on May 18, 1987. Initially the engine had an 8-blade forward and 8-blade aft fan configuration, and then it was replaced on the testbed by the second GE36 demonstrator engine, which had a 10-blade forward / 8-blade aft setup and completed 33 hours of flight tests beginning on August 14, 1987. Despite being quieter in that configuration, the engine was swapped back to the original 8x8 configuration because of a mechanical problem. GE also confirmed that for production, there would be more blades than on the demonstrator engine, and the number of blades on the front fan would be different from the number on the back fan.

After the testbed was reconfigured with the 8x8 engine setup, McDonnell Douglas conducted 22 customer demonstration flights from the Long Beach Airport. These customer demonstrations took place between January 22 and February 26 of 1988. The flights, which typically lasted about an hour and reached a cruise speed of Mach 0.76, hosted the prime minister of Finland, 110 executives from 35 airlines and four leasing companies, and 70 representatives of media, the United States military, suppliers, and other airline manufacturers. The general opinion was that the ride quality was little different than a normal flight, except for light vibration in the back seat during takeoff and climb. On March 25, 1988, McDonnell Douglas declared the flight test program complete.

McDonnell Douglas reinstalled the GE36 engine onto the MD-80 testbed for additional flight tests in July 1988. The trip was made to perform daily public demonstration flights at the Farnborough Air Show on September 4–11, 1988. Private flight demonstrations for invited airline executives were to be given before the air show, and McDonnell Douglas was considering flying the testbed to Western Europe before returning to the US. At the air show, McDonnell Douglas and GE began marketing discussions with seven airlines in the US and six in western Europe; they hoped to gain about 100 airline commitments by mid-1989 to launch the MD-91 and MD-92 programs, with entry into service in 1993 first for the MD-91, and then the MD-92 entering service a half-year later. GE36 testing on the MD-80 finished that month after 137 flights and nearly 240 flight hours. In total, there were 281 hours of flight tests between the two airplanes.

With demonstrator flight testing completed, the focus moved to construction of a new core (instead of the off-the-shelf F404) to increase efficiency. The compressor, combustor, and turbine had all been run separately by late 1988, and by mid-1989 the new core engine had been tested for about 50 hours. At the time of the project cancellation later in 1989, GE and Snecma were working on the design engineering of a full gas generator and a product propulsor.

The downfall of this engine at the time was economic conditions (mostly a major drop in oil prices) post OPEC oil embargo. Even though these engines never made it past development and prototype testing, GE has retained the carbon composite technology behind the lightweight fan blades. Carbon fiber blades are currently being used in engines (General Electric GE90 and General Electric GEnx) that power the Boeing 747, Boeing 777, and Boeing 787 Dreamliner.

General Electric donated one of the GE36 engines to the Smithsonian National Air and Space Museum via the Naval Air Systems Command in 1991.

Design
A General Electric F404 military turbofan on loan from the American government was used as the basis for the GE36 prototype. The F404 mixed exhaust stream discharged through a turbine which drove two contra-rotating stages of fans. Although the demonstrator engines had 8x8 and 10x8 fan blade configurations, the most efficient setup that was tested had a 12x10 blade configuration. The scimitar shape of the fan rotor blades could operate at high velocities to match turbojet or turbofan speeds, allowing the engine to power the proposed Boeing 7J7 airliner at a Mach 0.83 cruise speed. The production blades for the MD-91/MD-92 versions of the engine were to be designed for Mach 0.78–0.80 cruise.

The blades for the initial tests were manufactured directly by General Electric, but the blades for the flight tests were then made by local Ohio manufacturer Hartzell Propeller. For the production engines, the blades were to be made by British composite propeller specialist Dowty Rotol.

The power turbine was a six-stage turbine plus inlet and outlet guide vanes. The twelve turbine blade rows rotated alternate rows in opposite directions. Each stage was a pair of rotors; there were no stators (static vanes), which usually follow the single-rotor section to straighten out the flow. The front propeller and the front half of each stage are attached to a rotating outer casing that encloses the turbine rotor blades, while the back propeller and the back half of each stage are attached conventionally to a central shaft. The counter-rotating turbine can run at half the rpm of a conventional turbine, since counter-rotation doubles the relative velocity, so the engine did not require a reduction gearbox to drive the fan. The GE36 had a hub-to-blade tip radius ratio of 0.425, which as a gearless design reflected about a 75 percent higher value than for geared propfan designs. This characteristic occurred because the hub had to enclose a large turbine diameter; due to the low rotational speed demanded by the contra-rotating propellers, the turbine had to be wider than usual to generate enough power. GE's UDF had a bypass ratio of 35, which was about halfway between the IAE SuperFan's BPR of 17 and the PW-Allison 578-DX's BPR of 56. The contra-rotating propellers spun at a maximum rotational speed of at least 1,393 rpm.

GE had also predicted a cruise SFC of 0.49 for the demonstrator engine; however, the cruise SFC would drop to 0.40-0.41 with a new gas generator design called "Supercore," compared with 0.56 for existing turbofans. The two-spool core of the gas generator would have a pressure ratio of about 36. Snecma was to design the high-pressure compressor (HPC) and the combustion chamber. The engine configuration selected for the MD-91 and MD-92 was designed to meet the Chapter 4 community noise standards of the International Civil Aviation Organization's (ICAO's) Committee on Aviation Environmental Protection (CAEP), which would go into effect in 2006 and be a reduction of ten effective perceived noise decibels (EPNdB) from the existing Chapter 3 standards that were established in 1977. The regulatory compliance, however, caused a five-percent reduction in fuel efficiency compared to the most efficient fan configuration.

Variants
GE36-B14  engine powering the McDonnell Douglas MD-91X.
GE36-B22A  engine powering the Boeing 7J7.
GE36-C22  derated engine powering the 114-seat McDonnell Douglas MD-91.
GE36-C25  engine powering the 165-seat McDonnell Douglas MD-92.

Applications
 Boeing 727 (testbed)
 Boeing 7J7 (proposed)
 McDonnell Douglas MD-81 UHB testbed
 McDonnell Douglas MD-94X (proposed)

Specifications

See also

References

Bibliography

 
  alternate url
 
 
  alternate url
 
 
 
  alternate url
  alternate url
  alternate url
  alternate url

External links

 
 
 
 
 
 
 
 
 
 
 
 

Propfan engines
GE36